Helan-e Safarali (also Romanized as Helān-e Şafar‘alī; also known as Bālān-e Şafar ‘Alī) is a village in Chahardangeh Rural District, Hurand District, Ahar County, East Azerbaijan Province, Iran. At the 2006 census, its population was 145, in 30 families.

References 

Populated places in Ahar County